Pedro is a video game developed by Frank Johnson, Aidan Rajswing, Bryce Ducharm, Andrew Impson, Brian Carpenter and Steve Cain for the ZX Spectrum and released by Imagine Software in 1984. The game uses oblique projection to give the impression of three dimensional graphics.

Gameplay
The player controls the eponymous Pedro, a Mexican gardener, and the object of the game is to protect Pedro's plants from the various animals—such as ants and rats—that try to eat them. To do this Pedro must try to block the entrances to his garden with bricks, stamp on any animals that get in, and plant seeds to replace any plants that are eaten. In addition to this a tramp will break into the garden every now and then and try to steal Pedro's seeds. The game ends when no plants remain. Points are scored by stamping on animals, and a bonus is earned at the end of each level based on the number of plants remaining.

Reception
Pedro received mixed reviews from UK ZX Spectrum gaming magazines. While Sinclair User awarded the game 7/10 and Crash rated it at 62%, all three of Your Spectrum's reviewers gave the game a score of 4/10. All three magazines praised the game's music.

References

External links

1984 video games
Action video games
BBC Micro and Acorn Electron games
Commodore 64 games
Dragon 32 games
Single-player video games
Video games about insects
Video games about plants
Video games developed in the United Kingdom
Video games scored by Fred Gray
Video games set in Mexico
ZX Spectrum games